Nosphistica metalychna is a moth in the family Lecithoceridae. It was described by Edward Meyrick in 1935. It is known from southern China.

References

Moths described in 1935
Nosphistica